Zykov (masculine) or Zykova (feminine) is a Russian surname. Notable people with the surname include:

Valeri Zykov, Soviet footballer
Nikolai Zykov, Soviet and Russian actor, director, artist, designer, puppet-maker and puppeteer
Pyotr Zykov, Soviet general
Valentin Zykov, Russian ice hockey player

See also
Zykov Island, island in Antarctica
Zykov Glacier, glacier in Antarctica

Russian-language surnames